Jane is a subway station on Line 2 Bloor–Danforth of the Toronto subway in Toronto, Ontario, Canada.  It is located just north of Bloor Street West, spanning the block east of Jane Street to Armadale Avenue, with entrances from all three streets. It opened in 1968 as part of the westerly extension from Keele to Islington Station. Wi-Fi service is available at this station.

In 2006, this station became accessible with the addition of elevators between the street and platform level.

Entrances

The station's street entrances lead directly into the bus platform area in a layout that would not allow it to be readily brought into the station's fare-paid area. Until 1973 this was largely irrelevant because the station was on a fare zone boundary and the subway trains and some of the buses serving it were in separate zones.

At the west end, the Jane Street entrance is located just north of Bloor, on the east side of Jane Street. Similarly, at the other end of bus platform, there is an entrance directly from the west side of Armadale Avenue. Additionally, the station is accessible through automatic doors via a pedestrian walkway located mid-block on the north side of Bloor Street, between Jane and Armadale.

Nearby landmarks
The station serves the local communities of Bloor West Village, Swansea, Runnymede, Old Mill and Baby Point and nearby destinations such as the Bloor West Health Centre, St. Pius X Catholic School, St. Olave's Anglican Church, Windermere United Church and Jane/Dundas Public Library.

Surface connections

The station's bus platform is not within the fare-paid area.

TTC routes serving the station include:

Transit City LRT plan
The now-cancelled Transit City proposal called for a new LRT line known as the Jane LRT line, running along Jane Street from Pioneer Village station to Jane station.

References

External links

Line 2 Bloor–Danforth stations
Railway stations in Canada opened in 1968